This is a list of Chief Factors and chiefs of Fort Albany, including the Chief Factors of the Hudson's Bay Company that governed the fort when it was controlled by HBC, and the chiefs that have led Fort Albany First Nation since the establishment of a reserve on the territory in 1909, as well as their councils.

Chief Factors of Fort Albany 
Following the Hudson's Bay Company's rigid corporate structure, the original trading post of Fort Albany was run by a man with the title "Chief Factor", who oversaw the business of the fort (and consequently, the district). Some of the Chief Factors are listed below, along with the year of their appointment. The term "Governor" is sometimes used to refer to the employee overseeing the operations of the fort.

Ontario Justices of the Peace 
Once the settlement was made part of the Dominion of Canada (1869), and later the province of Ontario (awarded by arbitrators in 1878), the province appointed Justices of the Peace to assert its authority in its new northern reaches.

Albany Band Council

Indian Act (1909–1977) 
A band council was established for the Fort Albany First Nation, following the Indian Act.

Following split with Kashechewan (1977–2022) 

Kashechewan First Nation began having its own band council in 1977.

Custom Election Code (2022–present) 
A referendum of the First Nation's members on June 13, 2022 approved a Custom Election Code, with 22 of 39 votes cast in favour of the code. This Custom Election Code replaces the electoral process laid out in the Indian Act. The 2022 election was the first election in Fort Albany held under the custom code.

References 

Chief_Factors_and_chiefs_of_Fort_Albany
Chief_Factors_and_chiefs_of_Fort_Albany
Chief_Factors_and_chiefs_of_Fort_Albany
Fort Albany, List
Chief Factors of Fort Albany
Fort Albany, List
Fort Albany, List